Trithemis pluvialis, the russet dropwing (also known as river dropwing), is a species of dragonfly in the family Libellulidae. It occurs in Africa south of Kenya.

Description

The russet dropwing is a medium-sized dragonfly with a bright orange to reddish colouration and small orange patches on the hindwings. The abdomen shows small black dorsal stripes. The eyes are brownish orange. The female is stouter than the male and more mottled. The species often perches conspicuously on reeds or sedges.

Distribution
It is found in Angola, Cameroon, the Republic of the Congo, the Democratic Republic of the Congo, Kenya, Malawi, Mozambique, Namibia, South Africa, Tanzania, Zambia, and Zimbabwe. This dragonfly prefers swift rocky rivers with extensive reed margins in savanna habitats.

Conservation
The species is widely spread and populations do not appear to be declining, although like many dragonflies it is likely being impacted by water pollution, drainage and habitat loss through agricultural expansion and intensification.

References

External links

 Text for russet dropwing from South African Dragonfly Atlas 

pluvialis
Taxonomy articles created by Polbot
Insects described in 1906